There are 18 wild areas in the Pennsylvania state forests. There is also one proposed wild area: M. K. Goddard Wild Area in Sproul State Forest in Clinton County, named for Maurice K. Goddard.

References

External links
DCNR State Forest Wild Area map

Wild areas
Wild areas